Moyo Water Supply and Sanitation System (MWSS), also Moyo Water Supply and Sewerage System is a water intake, purification, distribution and waste water collection and disposal system in Moyo Town and surrounding metropolis in Moyo District, Uganda.

Location
The water treatment facility is located in Moyo Municipality, in Moyo District, in the West Nile sub-region, in Uganda's Northern Region. The raw water is sourced from two boreholes (Pamoju 1 and Pamoju 2), located in town's neighborhood known as Pamoju.

Overview
Prior to 2020, Moyo Municipality was supplied with water from a small antiquated system with a capacity to supply no more than 500 customers. The water scarcity in the town adversely affected businesses, families, schools and refugee centres.

In 2020, the government of Uganda, through the Uganda Ministry of Water and Environment and with joint funding from KfW of Germany, designed the Moyo Water Supply and Sanitation System.

The water supply system comprises two boreholes; Pamoju 1 and Pamoju 2. Water is pumped from these water sources to two  
Distribution pipes then convey the potable water to end-users.

Construction and funding
In 2020, the Uganda Ministry of Water and Environment, which is the implementing agency, awarded the engineering, procurement and construction (EPC) contract to Reddy's Borehole and Technical Services, a Ugandan company. Bright Technical Services, another Ugandan company, was the engineering supervisor. The construction cost is reported as USh6.4 billion (approx.US$1.855 million).

Other considerations
The sanitation component of the system comprises (a) "two blocks of six-station drainable latrines" constructed at one of the primary schools and (b) "a 13-stall toilet", connected to a septic tank. Construction lasted approximately one year.

The system as configured in September 2021 benefits an estimated 28,500 people in 39 villages in Moyo Municipality and environs.

See also
 Ministry of Water and Environment (Uganda)
 National Water and Sewerage Corporation

References

External links
 Website of National Water & Sewerage Corporation
 Website of Ministry of Water and Environment (Uganda)

Buildings and structures in Uganda
Moyo District
Water resources management
Northern Region, Uganda
West Nile sub-region
2021 establishments in Uganda